
Kirby Grindalythe is a village and civil parish in the Ryedale district of North Yorkshire, England. The village lies in the Great Wold Valley and the course of the winterbourne stream the Gypsey Race passes through it.

The civil parish of Kirby Grindalythe, which includes the village of Duggleby, had a population of 247 people living in 92 households at the time of the 2001 Census. The population at the 2011 Census had risen to 295.

The name of the village is derived from Old Norse. Kirby  kirkiubỹr means "village with a church", the Grindal element is a distortion of Cranedale, meaning "valley with cranes" and lythe is from Old Norse "hlíõ" meaning slope.  The village lies in the historic county boundaries of the East Riding of Yorkshire.

In 1823 Kirby Grindalythe was a civil parish with a population of 178 in the Wapentake of Buckrose.

Kirby Grindalythe village has a resident population of roughly fifty. There are no shops, pubs or other services and the nearest town is Malton. The church of St Andrew's at Kirby Grindalythe is on the Sykes Churches Trail having been restored by Sir Tatton Sykes in 1872–5 and again more recently after a grant of about £175,000 from English Heritage. The church is now a Grade II* listed building.

The village is also the location of the Cranedale Centre, a residential Field Studies Centre providing courses in environmental subjects and outdoor education to people of all ages. The centre operates from a converted farm and has been open since 1983.

High Mowthorpe
Also in the civil parish is the former hamlet of High Mowthorpe (
), which is now an ADAS farm and arable research centre. The farm is a mixed arable and livestock farm, covering  with  managed organically.  Laboratory and glasshouse facilities are located on the site as well as a weather station providing data to the Met Office.
High Mowthorpe is also the home of ADAS Pest Evaluation Services, which processes approximately 4,000 soil and plant samples annually to determine pest and disease levels.

Gallery

References

External links

Villages in North Yorkshire
Civil parishes in North Yorkshire